Ardeer can refer to:
Ardeer, North Ayrshire, Scotland
Ardeer Platform railway station in the area of the same name in Scotland
Ardeer, Victoria, a suburb in Melbourne, Victoria, Australia, named after the original Scottish location
Ardeer railway station in the suburb of the same name in Melbourne